Finger pulling, regionally known as Fingerhakeln (German), Trække krog (Danish), Fingerkrok (Norwegian and Swedish), and Sormikoukku (Finnish) is a sport practiced in many regions, predominantly Bavaria, Austria, Scandinavia, and Finland.

Rules

In finger pulling, both opponents sit at a table opposite one another and try to pull the opponent towards themselves over the table using one finger. By physical force, overcoming the pain of the finger being stretched and with appropriate technique, the opponent can be defeated. Any single finger is allowed in principle (but not the thumb), but usually the opponents hook their middle fingers in a leather strap. Sometimes, only the index fingers are hooked into each other without a strap. Behind both hookers, two Auffänger (person who catches the opponent) are sitting. Additionally, there is a referee, a chairman and two assessors.

History
Allegedly, disputes were settled by finger pulling in former times in countries of the Alps and the sport was part of the athletic tradition before a wide standardization took place.

In its present form, Fingerhakeln is an organized sport. Leather straps (about 10 cm long and 6 to 8 mm wide), table (79 cm high, 74 cm wide and 109 cm long), stools (40 by 40 cm, 48 cm high), and distance between the middle line and the sidelines (32 cm) are standardized. Every year, Bavarian, Austrian, German, and Alpine championships in different weight and age classes are held.

The German proverb Jemanden über den Tisch ziehen - literally "pull someone over the table", but with the meaning "to defeat, play off against someone" - has its origin in this popular sport in which not only force alone but especially technique can be decisive.

References

External links 

 "Fingerhakeln – nichts für Weicheier", Bericht von den 52. Deutschen Meisterschaften in Stötten am Auerberg; RP Online 26 July 2011, retrieved 31 March 2012.
 "Hermann Dreher holt beim Fingerhakeln in Stötten den deutschen Seniorentitel", all-in.de – das allgäu online 26 July 2011, retrieved 31 March 2012.

Combat sports
Individual sports
Games of physical skill
Fingers